The Pokljuka Plateau is a forested karst plateau at an elevation of around , located in the Julian Alps in northwestern Slovenia. 

The plateau is known for its forests, mountain pastures (Javornik, Lipanca, Uskovnica, Zajamniki, etc.), and winter sports facilities. It is also a common starting point for mountain hikers. Pokljuka is part of Triglav National Park. Administratively, it belongs to the municipalities of Bled, Bohinj, and Gorje.

Many beech and fir trees were chopped down in the 18th century for the iron foundries in Bohinj. They have been naturally replaced mostly by spruce trees. Some swamps can also be found, which is not usual on such high plateaus.

References

External links
Travel information and maps at the Pokljuka Sports Club website

Plateaus in Upper Carniola
Triglav National Park
Karst plateaus of Slovenia
Ski areas and resorts in Slovenia